Mobalufon is a West African town of what is today south-western Nigeria. The town was established by around the 15th century.

Origins

The journey of Sokanlu
The third immigration to the pre-colonial kingdom of Ijebu was under the leadership of Sokanlu, alias Ogborogannda later nicknamed Obanta. Arisu, later called Oba Ijasi, led the second. 
Sokanlu and his large following left their home, Wadai, in Upper Egypt in search of a new home, marching southwards in the direction of the west. Sokanlu's brother, Agba-Iwa, and their mother, Gborowo, were in the group. Some years after leaving Wadai, Agba-Iwa died; his son Oludiyimu, who later became the Mogun-Iseja of Mobalufon (Mogun-Iseja is the title of the King), was made lieutenant in place of his father. Many sturdy young men who bore arms supported him right and left.

The march south-westwards
The march south-westwards stretched over years as they stayed for short rest in no fewer than 75 places including Benin City and Ile-Ife, before finally settling at Ijebu-Ode. At Ile-Ife Oduduwa received the people with open arms but they continued their journey southwards until they got to the place the Ifá told them to remain. The trek to Ijebu-Ode was through the waterside and Epe. Several kilometres from their place of settlement, the man in charge of Ogborogannda's cat, nicknamed Elese, missed the pet animal. Ogborogannda was not pleased and as a result the Elese did not continue the journey after carrying Ogborogannda across the River Owa, he stayed at a place now known as Ilese. Gborowo, Ogborogannda's Mother, died on the way and could not get to Ijebu with the team.

Arrival at Ijebu-Ode
On getting to Ijebu-Ode, the Apebi played a noble part in introducing Ogborogannda and his followers to the Oba (ruler) of Ijasi. While they were waiting to be received, people who saw them referred to Ogborogannda as Ebo ni'ta, that is Ebo wa ni'ta which later became shortened to Obanta. Ogborogannda and his people settled finally at Ijebu-Ode. The Mogun-Iseja settled at Iberikodo.

Founding of Mobalufon
After living at Ijebu-Ode for some time, the Mogun-Iseja left his Iberikodo home to found Mobalufon. He left with his instruments of war, all his paraphernalia of office, his beaded crown, and his Obalufon. He made a shrine for his Obalufon in the thick egi forest and also a place for the Agba-Iwa (perverted to Agbaruwa), a god he worshiped to immortalise his father Agba-Iwa, who died some years after leaving Wadai. Imu-Obalufon that is the Shrine of the Obalufon, as the place was first called became shortened to Mobalufon. Mogun-Iseja met nobody at Mobalufon when he got there. It was said that the egi trees interlocked branches so much so that some daring young men got to the River Owa (in Mobalufon) moving from branch to branch without getting down. Up till today the sanctuary of Obalufon is at Mobalufon.

Populated places in Ogun State